"Me and Bobby and Bobby's Brother" is a song by ABBA, released on their 1973 album Ring Ring.

Synopsis
The song is about "a woman's reminiscence of her childhood friends".

Critical reception
Abba - Uncensored on the Record said, "the strangely-titled 'Me and Bobby and Bobby's Brother' bears the mark of a relatively inexperienced lyricist", adding that, "Björn swiftly improved on this". It also said the song was, "another fairly typical early ditty that was not unlike" Me and Bobby McGee' in melody at times", and that it, "was certainly nothing more than album filler".

Other versions 
 Norwegian singer Hans Petter Hansen recorded a Norwegian-language version in 1976, titled "Gnist og flammer" ("Sparks and flames"). While retaining the original structure and music, the rewritten lyrics were about Hansens' former career as a sheet metal worker in the oil industry.

References

1973 songs
ABBA songs
Songs about nostalgia